Indhu Rubasingham, is a British theatre director and the current artistic director of the Kiln Theatre (formerly the Tricycle Theatre) in Kilburn, London.

Early life 
Born in Sheffield to Tamil parents from Sri Lanka in 1970, Rubasingham was educated at Nottingham Girls' High School, after which she studied drama at Hull University, where she received an honorary doctorate in 2017.

Career

Freelance directing 
Soon after graduating from Hull University, Rubasingham received an Arts Council bursary to work as a trainee director at the Theatre Royal Stratford East, where she assisted director Mike Leigh. She then worked as a freelance theatre director for over fifteen years and during this time held posts as an associate director at the Gate Theatre, the Young Vic, and the Birmingham Repertory Theatre.

She has worked across the UK and internationally. Her focus has been predominantly directing new writing and developing exciting voices. Themes that often arise in her work explore and examine ideas around British identity and the threads of human connection that crosses race, culture and identity; telling stories from different perspectives and specificity that reveals the universality of the human spirit.

Rubasingham had a long relationship with the international department at the Royal Court Theatre when headed by Elyse Dodgson which allowed her to forge relationships with playwrights from Cuba, Mexico, Brazil, Uganda and India. Indhu has also had a longstanding relationship with Sundance Theatre Lab (2011–2019), under the artistic directorship of Philip Himberg. She has directed radio plays for BBC Radio 4, BBC Radio 3 and the BBC World Service.

She is a trustee for the Royal Opera House, Metroland (Brent), the George Devine Award and the Susan Smith Blackburn Prize. Previous trustee positions include Mountview Academy of Theatre Arts, British Council Advisory Board and the Regional Theatre Young Directors Scheme, for which Rubasingham is currently a patron. She is on the judging panel for the Channel 4 Playwriting Scheme and the Phil Fox Award for Playwriting. Since 2021, she has been on the judging panel of The Women's Prize for Playwriting, becoming Chair in 2023.  

In 2017, Rubasingham was awarded an MBE in the 2017 New Year Honours List.

As artistic director
Indhu Rubasingham succeeded Nicolas Kent as artistic director of the Tricycle Theatre in 2012. In April 2018, after a capital renovation, the theatre's name was changed to the Kiln Theatre.  

Rubasingham's mission for Kiln Theatre is to make theatre for all by making space for unheard/ignored voices to be part of the mainstream and be a local theatre with an international vision. The theatre sits in the Borough of Brent.

Rubasingham oversaw a £9 million major renovation of the building, which reopened in 2018. The revamped building includes an adaptable stage in the larger 292-seat theatre, better sightlines, new lighting facilities, a new café, improved disabled access and gender-neutral toilets.

Under her artistic leadership, the creative engagement programme aims to champion the imagination, aspiration and potential of the Brent community young and old.

During her time as artistic director, her production of Red Velvet by Lolita Chakrabarti was transferred to the West End's Garrick Theatre and St Ann's Warehouse Theater in New York. Her production of Moira Buffini's Handbagged was transferred to the West End's Vaudeville Theatre prior to a UK tour before playing at 59e59 in New York and Washington, D.C.'s Round House Theatre. Her production of Zadie Smith's The Wife of Willesden has transferred to American Repertory Theatre, Harvard University and Brooklyn Academy of Music. 

Rubasingham programmed Florian Zeller's ‘Family Trilogy,’ including 'The Son,' which was transferred to the West End's Duke of York's Theatre in 2019; and The Father, which was transferred to the West End's Wyndham's Theatre in 2015 before being moved to the West End's Duke of York's Theatre in 2016. The Father was adapted for the 2020 film starring Anthony Hopkins and Olivia Colman, directed by Zeller.

In August 2014, while she was artistic director, she was at the centre of an antisemitism controversy over the funding of the UK Jewish Film Festival, intended to have been held at the theatre.

Awards 
 Best Director, The Father and the Assassin, Eastern Eye Arts, Culture & Theatre Awards (2023)
 Kiln Theatre ‘Best London Theatre’ The Stage Awards (2021)
 Best Director, White Teeth, ACTA – Eastern Eye's Arts Culture & Theatre Awards (2019)
 Tonic Awards (2017)
 Olivier Award for Outstanding Achievement in an Affiliate Theatre, Handbagged (2014)
 The Arts & Culture Award, Asian Women of Achievement Awards (2012)
 Liberty Human Rights Award (2010)
 The Carlton Multi-Cultural Achievement Award for Performing Arts (2001)

Productions

References

Living people
English theatre directors
English people of Sri Lankan Tamil descent
Members of the Order of the British Empire
Women theatre directors
People from Sheffield
Alumni of the University of Hull
People educated at Nottingham Girls' High School
Year of birth missing (living people)